The 1994 Individual Long Track World Championship was the 24th edition of the FIM speedway Individual Long Track World Championship. The event was held on 25 September 1994 at the Mariánské Lázně in the Czech Republic.

The world title was won by Simon Wigg of England for the fifth time.

Final Classification 

 E = eliminated (no further ride)
 f = fell
 ef = engine failure
 x = excluded

References 

1994
Speedway competitions in the Czech Republic
Motor
Motor